Frédéric St-Denis (born January 23, 1986) is a Canadian ice hockey defenceman. He is currently an unrestricted free agent who most recently played under contract with EHC München of the Deutsche Eishockey Liga (DEL).

Playing career
In his first professional season, in 2008–09, St. Denis played primarily with the Cincinnati Cyclones of the ECHL and for the 2009–10 season with for the Hamilton Bulldogs of the AHL. On July 1, 2010, he signed a one-year contract as a free agent with NHL affiliate of the Bulldogs, the Montreal Canadiens.

On July 15, 2011, St Denis re-signed to a one-year, two way contract with the Montreal Canadiens. During the following 2011–12 season, he was recalled to the Canadiens and later scored his first NHL goal against Roberto Luongo of the Vancouver Canucks, on December 8, 2011.

On July 7, 2013, St Denis left the Canadiens organization as a free agent and signed a one-year two-way contract with the Columbus Blue Jackets. He served as an alternate captain for AHL affiliate, the Springfield Falcons.

After two seasons within the Blue Jackets organization, St-Denis left as a free agent to sign his first contract abroad on a one-year deal with German club, EHC München of the DEL on August 11, 2015.

Career statistics

References

External links

1986 births
Canadian ice hockey defencemen
Columbus Blue Jackets players
Cincinnati Cyclones (ECHL) players
Drummondville Voltigeurs players
French Quebecers
Hamilton Bulldogs (AHL) players
Ice hockey people from Quebec
Living people
Montreal Canadiens players
EHC München players
Sportspeople from Longueuil
Springfield Falcons players
Undrafted National Hockey League players
Canadian expatriate ice hockey players in Germany